EFK may refer to:
 École Française du Kansai, now the Lycée français international de Kyoto, a French international school in Japan
 Evangelical Free Church in Sweden
 Northeast Kingdom International Airport, in Vermont, United States